Ty Ty Creek is a stream in the U.S. state of Georgia. It is a tributary to Warrior Creek.

Ty Ty Creek derives its name from the titi trees growing near its banks.

References

Rivers of Georgia (U.S. state)
Rivers of Colquitt County, Georgia
Rivers of Tift County, Georgia
Rivers of Worth County, Georgia